Damodar Ganesh Bapat (1934 or 1935 – 17 August 2019) was an Indian social worker known for his service to the leprosy patients at Bhartiya Kushta Nivarak Sangh (BKNS) in Janjgir–Champa district, Chhattisgarh, India. In 2018, the Government of India awarded him the Padma Shri, India's fourth highest civilian award, in recognition of his social work. He was also awarded the Chhattisgarh Rajya Alankar by the state of Chhattisgarh.

Early life
Bapat was born in the Pathrot village in Amravati district in Maharashtra, India in 1934 or 1935. He completed his Bachelor of Arts and Bachelor of Commerce degrees from Nagpur. After completing his studies, he worked at several places. He was not happy with his jobs and was interested in social work.

Social work
In 1970, he moved to Jashpur, in Chhattisgarh, and started volunteering with Vanvasi Kalyan Ashram which works in rural areas in India. Initially he worked there as a teacher for the tribal children. While teaching he also met leprosy patients and remained there to serve them throughout his life.

Bapat along with Katre worked together to cure the leprosy patients as well as their social and financial rehabilitation. In 1975, Bapat was appointed the secretary of Bharatiya Kushtha Nivarak Sangh, and its growth thereafter is credited to him. From 1972 until his death in 2019, he served leprosy patients. He also worked to improve public awareness about leprosy. Dainik Jagran reported in 2019 that he had improved the lives of an estimated 26,000 leprosy patients.

Awards
In 2018, the Government of India awarded him the Padma Shri in recognition of his social work. He was awarded the Chhattisgarh Rajya Alankar by the state of Chhattisgarh. Shri Badabazar Kumar Sabha Pustakalaya in Kolkata awarded him the Vivekananda Seva Puraskar; Bhaurao Deoras Foundation awarded him Bhaurao Deoras Seva Smruti Puraskar.

On 12 September 2006, he was awarded the tenth Devi Ahilyabai National Award by Shri Ahilyotsav Samiti in Indore for his work in the rehabilitation, education and improvement in health of leprosy patients and making them self-reliant.

Death
In July 2019, Bapat suffered a brain hemorrhage after which he was admitted to a Hospital in Bilaspur. He died on 17 August 2019 at 2:35 a.m. at a hospital in Chhattisgarh at the age of 84 years. He donated his body to Chhattisgarh Institute of Medical Sciences, Bilaspur for research purposes.

The Governor of Chhattisgarh, Anusuiya Uikey and Chief Minister Bhupesh Baghel condoled his death appreciating his work in serving leprosy patients.

References

1930s births
2019 deaths
Recipients of the Padma Shri in social work
People from Chhattisgarh
People from Amravati district
Indian social workers